Santiano may refer to:

Santiano (band), German band in the Eurovision Song Contest 2014
"Santiano" (song), 1961 song by French singer Hugues Aufray, cover version No.1 in France 2005
"Aweigh, Santy Ano", version by The Weavers 1958, of "Santianna", the original sea shanty tune on which Aufray's song is based